Malcolm Lockheed (né Malcolm Loughead;  - ) was an American aviation engineer who formed the Alco Hydro-Aeroplane Company along with his brother, Allan Loughead, also known as Allan Lockheed. This company went on to become the Lockheed Corporation.

Life
Loughead was the son of Flora and John Loughead.  He had a half-brother Victor, a sister Hope, and a brother Allan Lockheed.

Loughead also patented the first hydraulic brakes in 1917; these were adopted by Duesenberg for their 1921 Model A.

In 1919, Malcolm and his brother Allen were awarded the Order of the Golden Crown by King Albert of Belgium.

Notes

References
Allan and Malcolm Loughead (Lockheed) Their Early Lives in the Santa Cruz Mountains

1886 births
1958 deaths
Businesspeople in aviation
Recipients of the Order of the Crown (Belgium)